Clarence K. Lam (born November 26, 1980) is an American politician and public health physician. He is a Democratic member of the Maryland Senate from the 12th district who previously served in the Maryland House of Delegates from the 12th district. Lam is a co-chair of the Joint Audit and Evaluation Committee, and is a member of the Joint Committee on Fair Practices & State Personnel Oversight. Lam has been an advocate against the practice "lunch shaming" in schools, where elementary school students with unpaid lunch debt are punished by teaching staff. In February 2020,  Lam introduced Senate Bill 760 to the Senate, which was designed to ban the practice.

Lamb is a physician at the Johns Hopkins Bloomberg School of Public Health.

Election results

References

External links
 

Asian-American people in Maryland politics
Emmaus High School alumni
Democratic Party Maryland state senators
Democratic Party members of the Maryland House of Delegates
Living people
21st-century American politicians
1980 births
21st-century American physicians
American public health doctors